This is a list of notable guest stars who appeared in the American television sitcom 3rd Rock from the Sun throughout its six season run.

Guest stars

Season 1
 Harry Morgan - (3 episodes, seasons 1 & 2) playing Professor Suter, an elderly colleague of Dick and Mary
 Martha Stewart - playing herself
 Phil Hartman - (seasons 1 & 3) playing a camp cosmetics store worker and Randy, Vicki Dubcek's ex-lover
 Jane Lynch - playing Tommy's science teacher, Ms. Koppel
 Ed Begley Jr. - playing Jeff
 John Mahoney - playing Leonard Hamlin, a rude, sexist professor
 Lauren Graham - playing Laurie Ives
 John Raitt - playing Singing Truck Driver
 Katherine LaNasa - playing single mother
 Bronson Pinchot - playing Mary's brother, Roy Albright
 Marla Sokoloff - playing Dina, Tommy's lab partner and love interest

Season 2
 Dennis Rodman - playing himself; it is revealed that he is actually another alien
 George Takei - playing himself at a sci-fi convention
 Al Franken - playing Harry's opponent in the City Council election
 Mike Ditka - playing Coach Mafferty; coach for Pendelton Badgers
 Mark Hamill - playing himself
 Christine Baranski - playing Sonja Umdahl
 Randy Newman - playing himself
 Dick Martin-playing sociology professor Dr. Ben Littmeyer
 Greg Proops

Season 3
 Roseanne Barr - playing Dick's forced-wife Janet
 Leigh McCloskey - playing Matthew, a yoga instructor
 Elaine Stritch - (seasons 3 & 6) playing Martha Albright, Mary's mother
 George Grizzard - (seasons 3 & 4) playing George Albright, Mary's Father
 Cindy Crawford - playing Mascha, a Venusian woman
 Angie Everhart - playing Chloe, A Venusian woman dating Tommy
 Dom DeLuise - playing the father of Dick's student Bug
 Peter DeLuise - playing Franky
 John Cleese - (seasons 3 & 6) playing Professor Liam Neesam, a hostile alien
 Sam Lloyd - playing Eddie, a man Dick helps.

Season 4
 Laurie Metcalf - playing Jennifer Ravelli, a teacher of comparative literature
 Kathy Bates - playing Charlotte Everley, an alien hunter
 Gil Christner - playing Carl, a Nobel Laureate
 William Shatner - (seasons 4 & 5) playing The Big Giant Head (a.k.a. Stone Phillips)
 Aaron Paul - (Season 4) Playing the Junior Prom King & Queen announcer
Kurtwood Smith (Season 4) Playing Dick's "cousin" Jacob when they attend a Solomon family reunion
Bryan Cranston - Plays a Neil Diamond Impersonator (whom Sally kisses) Season 4 Episode 14
Emily Osment - Plays Dahlia

Season 5
 Billy Connolly - playing an actor who is playing the part of Inspector McAffrey
 David Hasselhoff - playing a plastic surgeon
 Jonathan Frakes - playing Larry McMichael, the husband of Mary's friend Gwen
 Genie Francis - playing Gwen McMichael, the wife of Larry McMichael
 Chyna - playing Janice, a police officer
 Miguel Ferrer - playing Jack McMannus, a government agent
 Alan Cumming - playing Angus 'The Hole' McDuff, a hole expert
 Enrico Colantoni - playing Frank, an ex-student of Mary's
 Bob Odenkirk - plays as Gary Parkinson an insurance salesman in "The Fifth Solomon" (episode 3 season 5)
Olivia d'Abo - playing Andrea, woman overheard on police scanner (episode 20)

Season 6
 Megan Mullally - playing Renata Albright, Mary's sister
 Elvis Costello - playing himself
 Mark McKinney - Playing a new alien that stumbled through the Solomon's closet door.
Andrea Speyer - Guest Star as Claire Volk

References

See also
 3rd Rock from the Sun episodes
 3rd Rock from the Sun

3rd Rock from the Sun characters